Charles-François du Périer Dumouriez (26 January 1739 – 14 March 1823) was a French military officer, minister of foreign affairs, minister of war in a Girondin cabinet and army general during the French Revolutionary Wars. He shared with General François Christophe Kellermann the first French victory at Valmy where the Prussian army was forced to draw back. He rapidly advanced north (till Moerdijk) but decided to return to Brussels when the French armies lost territory in Belgium. He disagreed with the radical Convention and deputies on the annexation of the country. Early April 1793 he deserted the Revolutionary Army. Dumouriez defected to the Austrians after he refused to surrender himself to the recently installed Revolutionary Tribunal. He became a royalist intriguer during the reign of Napoleon as well as an adviser to the British government.

Early life
Dumouriez was born in Cambrai, on the Scheldt River in northern France, to parents of noble rank. His father, Antoine-François du Périer, served as a commissary of the royal army, and educated his son most carefully and widely. He continued his studies in Paris at the Lycée Louis-le-Grand, and then sent to his uncle in Versailles for a year. In 1757 began his military career as a volunteer and served in the campaigns of the Seven Years' War. In the Battle of Rossbach, he served as a cornet in the Régiment d'Escars. He was stationed in Emden, Münster, Wesel and carried a small library with him. He received a commission for good conduct in action, with distinction (receiving 22 wounds during the battle of Corbach). In 1761 he recovered in the baths at Aachen. After the peace of Hubertusburg he retired at Abbeville as a captain, with a small pension (which was never paid), a love affair with his niece and the cross of St Louis.

Dumouriez then visited Italy and Corsica, Spain and Portugal, and his memoranda to the duc de Choiseul on Corsican affairs at the time of the Corsican Republic led to his re-employment on the staff of the French expeditionary corps sent to the island, for which he gained the rank of lieutenant-colonel. In 1767 Choiseul gave Dumouriez a military command as deputy quartermaster general to the Army of Corsica under the Marquis de Chauvelin. After this, he became a member of the Secret du Roi, the secret service under Louis XV, which gave full scope to his diplomatic skills. In 1770 he undertook a mission into Poland to the Confederation of Bar, where, in addition to his political business, he organized a Polish militia for the War of the Bar Confederation. On 23 May, his Polish soldiers were smashed by the Russian forces of General Alexander Suvorov in the Battle of Lanckorona. The fall of Choiseul (1770) brought about Dumouriez's recall. In 1772, upon returning to Paris, Dumouriez sought a military position from the marquis de Monteynard, Secretary of State for War, who gave him a staff position with the regiment of Lorraine writing diplomatic and military reports. In 1773, he found himself imprisoned in the Bastille for six months, apparently for diverting funds intended for the employment of secret agents into the payment of personal debts. During his six months of captivity Dumouriez occupied himself with literary pursuits. He was then removed to Caen, where he remained in detention until the accession of Louis XVI in 1774. Dumouriez was then recalled to Paris and assigned to posts in Lille and Boulogne-sur-Mer by the comte de Saint-Germain, the new king's minister of war.

Upon his release, Dumouriez married his cousin, a certain Mademoiselle de Broissy. In the meantime, Dumouriez had turned his attention to the internal state of his own country, and amongst the very numerous memoranda which he sent to the government was a project  on the defence of Normandy and  Cherbourg navy port, which procured for him in 1778 the post of commandant of Cherbourg.  He administered with much success for more than ten years. The construction of the fortifications and dikes began in 1779/1782 and extended in 1786. He used a plan by Vauban to create an outer port. Even the King came to see it. For his ingenuity in fortifying he became a maréchal de camp in 1788. After the Storming of the Bastille he became commander of the National Guard in July 1789, but his ambition was not satisfied. He proved a neglectful and unfaithful husband, and in 1789 the couple separated. Madame Dumouriez took refuge in a convent.

Political career 
  

At the outbreak of the Revolution, seeing the opportunity for carving out a new career, he went to Paris, where he joined the Jacobin Club. The death of Mirabeau, to whose fortunes he had attached himself, proved a great blow. However, opportunity arose again when, in his capacity as a lieutenant-general and the commandant of Nantes, he offered to march to the assistance of the National Constituent Assembly after the royal family's unsuccessful flight to Varennes. Minister of War, Louis Lebègue Duportail, promoted Dumouriez from president of the War Council to major-general in June 1791 and attached him to the Twelfth Division, which was commanded by General Jacques Alexis de Verteuil.

He then attached himself to the Girondist party and, on 15 March 1792, became the French minister of foreign affairs. Dumouriez was very friendly with Armand Gensonné according to Robespierre. In 1790, Dumouriez was appointed French military advisor to the newly established independent Belgian government and remained dedicated to the cause of an independent Belgian Republic. He then selected Lebrun-Tondu as his first officer for Belgian and Liégeois affairs. The relationship between the Girondists and Dumouriez was not based on ideology, but rather based on the practical benefit it gave to both parties. Dumouriez needed people in the Legislative Assembly to support him, and the Girondists needed a general to give them legitimacy in the army. He played a major part in the declaration of war against Austria (20 April), and he planned an attack on Tournai and the invasion of the Austrian Netherlands. His foreign policy was greatly influenced by Jean-Louis Favier. Favier had called for France to break its ties with Austria. 

On the king's dismissal of Roland, Clavière and Servan (13 June 1792), he took Servan's post of minister of war, but resigned it a few days days later on account of Louis XVI's refusal to come to terms with the National Constituent Assembly, concerning his suspensive veto. Within a week he joined the army of the North under Marshal Luckner. After the émeute of 10 August 1792 and Lafayette’s flight, he gained appointment to the command of the "Army of the Centre". At the same moment, France's enemies assumed the offensive. Dumouriez acted promptly from Sedan, Ardennes.

On August 24, 1792, Dumouriez wrote to his ally General François Kellermann about the void in military power within France. Within this letter, Dumouriez voices his opinions adamantly that Lafayette was a "traitor" to France after being arrested for mobilizing his army from the borders of France to Paris to protect the Royal family from revolutionaries who were dissatisfied with the monarchy of France at the time. Within this letter, Dumouriez's attachment to the Jacobin club is explicitly present as he tells Kellermann that the army was finally "purged of aristocrats". Dumouriez's loyalty to France's military which was evident within this letter was instrumental to him ascending to his future position of Foreign Minister of France from March 1792 to June 1792, restoring the natural borders of France. Dumouriez outmaneuvered the invading forces of the Duke of Brunswick in the forest of Argonne.
His subordinate Kellermann repulsed the Prussians at Valmy (20 September 1792). After these military victories, Dumouriez was ready to invade Belgium to spread revolution in the Flanders campaign.

Army of the North
 

Supported by minister Lebrun-Tondu, he declared in the National Convention on 12 October that he would liberate the Belgians and the Liège people. On 27 October, 1792, he invaded the Austrian Netherlands. Dumouriez himself severely defeated the Austrians at Jemappes (6 November 1792). He became a military hero for this decisive victory in which the newspaper "Révolutions de Paris" proclaimed him the liberator of the Belgians. On 14 November he arrived in Bruxelles. Several times he received a mission of Dutch patriots/revolutionairies with whom he agreed on the principles; De Kock, Daendels and his friends settled in Antwerp. Cambon pointed at the empty treasury and the wealthy Dutch. Dumouriez wrote a letter to the Convention scolding it for not supplying his army to his satisfaction and for the Decree of 15 December, which allowed the French armies to loot in the territory they had won, besides the introduction of the inflation-prone assignats in the conquered areas, and to expropriate church property. The Decree insured that any plan concerning Belgium would fail due to a lack of popular support among the Belgians.

War with the Dutch Republic

Returning to Paris on 1 January 1793, Dumouriez encountered popular ovation, but he gained less sympathy from the revolutionary government. On 12 January he had a meeting with Lebrun-Tondu; on 23 January he was sent back. The Dutch were willing to pay and an invasion of the Netherlands was postponed. To the more radical elements in Paris, it became clear that Dumouriez was not a true patriot but worked during the trial of Louis XVI to save him from execution. On 29 January Dumouriez lost his negotiating mandate. With the help of the Girondists, Dumouriez, ensured that defaulting Pache had to resign at the end of January 1793; at the most critical moment of the war. 

To declare war had always been a prerogative of the king. On 1 February Brissot declared war against King of Great Britain and the stadtholder of the Dutch Republic, not the people. The next day Miranda, the only general from Latin America in French service, gave the command  of the French forces back to Dumouriez. Although Dumouriez advised the government, simply to recognise Belgium's independence, the Jacobins sent several agents. On 7 February Dumouriez appreciated the secret proposals of Van de Spiegel and Baron Auckland: in exchange for recognition of French Republic, France would have to refrain from aggression against other countries. On 15 February, Johan Valckenaer addressed Cambon, the president of the Convention, to give not the committee but Dumouriez all powers to depose regents and restore others to power. Lazare Carnot proposed that annexation be undertaken on behalf of French interests whether or not the people to be annexed so wished.  On 17 February 1793, the French troops and the Batavian Legion crossed the Dutch border. Miranda, Stengel, Dampierre, Valence,  and Eustace went northeast; Dumouriez and Daendels  went northwest.   Breda, Klundert, and Geertruidenberg were occupied  with an army of Sans-Culottes that lacked almost everything.  After the French lost Venlo, Aachen, Maastricht and all the supply at Liège early March, Dumouriez was ordered to return to Bruxelles rather than further entering Holland.  The situation was alarming. Miranda wrote Dumouriez to continue his plan and not return to Belgium. 

On 11 March, Dumouriez addressed the Brussels assembly, apologizing for the actions of the French commissioners and looting soldiers. On 12 March Dumouriez wrote an angry, insolent letter which is considered as a "declaration of war on the Convention". He criticized the interference of officials of the War Ministry which employed many Jacobins. He attacked not only Pache, the former minister of war, but also Marat and Robespierre. Meanwhile Danton initiated the creation of the Revolutionary Tribunal to interrogate the generals at some time. Dumouriez had long been unable to agree with the course of the Convention. He was disenchanted with the radicalization of the revolution and its politics and put an end to the annexation efforts. He was liked by the Belgium population. It seems both Eustace and Miranda disagreed; on 14 March Eustace wrote a letter to Dumouriez. On 18 March 1793, Dumouriez's  army attacked the Governor of the Habsburg Netherlands, also the brother of the Austrian emperor, Josias of Saxe-Coburg-Saalfeld's army. A major defeat in the Battle of Neerwinden nearly ended the French invasion.  On 22 March Dumouriez opened negotiations with the Austrian General Mack. He allowed Dumouriez to retreat to Brussels whose soldiers were deserting in large numbers. The next day Dumouriez promised the Austrians he would leave Belgium.  (N.B. He had no permission and was without approval of the convention.) On 25 March Dumouriez asked Karl Mack his support to march on the capital. He would negotiate peace, dissolve the convention, restore the French Constitution of 1791, plea for the restoration of a constitutional monarchy and free Marie-Antoinette and her children. He urged the  Duke of Chartres, still a teenager, to join his plan.

Dumouriez' defeat

The Jacobin leaders were quite sure that France had come close to a military coup mounted by Dumouriez. On 20 March Danton and Charles-François Delacroix were sent to Lille. Dumouriez sensed a trap and invited them to his headquarters. They were escorted by Joseph Bologne, a French Creole from Guadeloupe, leading an all-black regiment. The commissioners sent Miranda to Paris. On 24 March, Miranda blamed Dumouriez for the defeat in the Battle of Neerwinden (1793) in front of the Convention; he was not consulted in respecting the battle order. (On 25 March Robespierre became one of the 25 members of the Committee of General Defence, which changed its name to Committee of Public Safety, to coordinate the war effort.) By the end of the month Robespierre called for the removal of Dumouriez, who in his eyes aspired to become a Belgian dictator or duke of Brabant. A body of commissioners was sent to arrest him.
 To their surprise Dumouriez arrested the five and the next day he handed them over to General Clerfayt. (They were kept in Austrian prisons for more than a year). In the evening he had supper with Madame de Genlis. On 3 April Robespierre declared before the Convention that the whole war was a prepared game between Dumouriez and Brissot to overthrow the First French Republic. On 4 April the convention declared Dumouriez a traiter and outlaw and put a prize on his head. 

 

Dumouriez had long been unable to agree with the course of the Convention. Dumouriez prevented the execution of the decrees of 15 and 27 December, according Robespierre.  He did not want the Dutch Republic to come under French authority, or even to be incorporated. It was his army that liberated the south of the Netherlands, and he would not allow it to fall into the hands of commissioners of the Convention. The general refused to obey the decree by the National Convention presented to him by Camus, Bancal-des-Issarts, Quinette, and Lamarque) accompanied  by the acting Minister of War, Pierre Riel de Beurnonville, a friend. Arresting the five, he handed them over to Clairfayt the next day. On 4 April Davout's volunteer battalion tried to arrest Dumouriez. Then Dumouriez unsuccessfully tried to persuade Davout to his side and made a move to save himself from his radical enemies. Then he attempted to persuade his troops to march on Paris and overthrow the revolutionary government. The attempt proved unfeasible because many of his soldiers were staunch republicans and several of his officers opposed him.  Without escort he rode on horseback to Tournai, along with his chief of staff Pierre Thouvenot, the Duke of Chartres, duc de Montpensier he arrived  into the Austrian camp. This blow left the Brissotins vulnerable due to their association with Dumouriez. On 10 April Robespierre accused him in a speech: "Dumouriez and his supporters have brought a fatal blow to the public fortune, preventing circulation of assignats in Belgium". Suspicion rose against Phillipe Égalité, because of the friendship of his eldest son, with Dumouriez. He would be arrested that same day.

The French armies took positions behind the frontier. The Army of Holland deployed near Lille, the Army of the Ardennes at Maulde, the Army of the North at Saint-Amand, and the Army of Belgium at Condé-sur-l'Escaut and Valenciennes.

Later life and death

Following his defection on 5 April 1793, Dumouriez remained in Brussels for a short time, and then travelled to Cologne, seeking a position at the elector's court. He soon learned he had become an object of suspicion among his countrymen, the royal houses, aristocracies, and clergy of Europe. In response, Dumouriez wrote and published in Hamburg a first volume of memoirs in which he offered his version of the previous year's events.

Dumouriez now wandered from country to country, occupied in ceaseless royalist intrigues, until 1804 when he settled in England, where the British government granted him a pension. He became a valuable adviser to the British War Office, and the Duke of York and Albany in his struggle against Napoleon, though the extent of his aid only became public many years later. In 1814 and 1815, he endeavoured to procure from Louis XVIII the baton of a marshal of France, but failed to do so. He died at Turville Park, near Henley-on-Thames, on 14 March 1823. Dumouriez's memoirs appeared at Hamburg in 1794. An enlarged edition, La Vie et les mémoires du Général Dumouriez, appeared at Paris in 1823. Dumouriez also wrote a large number of political pamphlets.

References

External links

 Patricia Chastain Howe (2008) Foreign Policy and the French Revolution. Charles- François Dumouriez, Pierre LeBrun, and the Belgian Plan, 1789–1793
 J.M. Thompson (1929) Leaders of the French Revolution: Dumouriez, p. 200-216

1739 births
1823 deaths
French generals
People from Cambrai
French Republican military leaders of the French Revolutionary Wars
Military leaders of the French Revolutionary Wars
Bar confederates
People of the Patriottentijd
Secretaries of State for War (France)
Lycée Louis-le-Grand alumni
Names inscribed under the Arc de Triomphe
18th-century French politicians
Prisoners of the Bastille
Girondins